Paul Louis Legentilhomme  (March 26, 1884 – May 23, 1975) was an officer in the French Army during World War I and World War II.  After the fall of France in 1940, he joined the forces of the Free French.  Legentilhomme was a recipient of the "Order of the Liberation" (Compagnon de la Libération).

Early life
Legentilhomme was born on March 26, 1884 in Valognes, Manche.

History

He was a cadet at the École Spéciale Militaire de Saint-Cyr 1905 to 1907 (promotion "la Dernière du vieux Bahut").
Promoted to Sub-Lieutenant in 1907.
Promoted to Lieutenant in 1909.

In 1914 his unit took part in the battle of Neufchâteau in Belgium, on August 22, and was captured by the Germans.
He spent 1914 to 1918 in German captivity.
In 1918 he was promoted to Captain.

He was promoted to Major in 1924.
From 1926 to 1928 he was Chief of Staff in Madagascar.
In 1929 he was promoted to Lieutenant Colonel
From 1929 to 1931 he was Chief of Staff 3rd Colonial Division.
In 1934 he was promoted to Colonel
From 1937 to 1938 he was  Commanding Officer 4th Senegalese Tirailleurs Regiment.
In 1938 he was promoted to Brigadier-General.

1939 to 1940 he was Commander in Chief of the French military units stationed in French Somaliland (present day Djibouti).

June 18, 1940 :  In Djibouti, the capital of French Somaliland, Legentilhomme condemned the French armistice and declared his intention to continue the war with the British Empire.  He declared this in his "General Order Number 4".
August 2, 1940  : Left French Somaliland (Vichy French until 1942) and went to the United Kingdom.
October 31, 1940 : Legentilhomme stripped of his French citizenship by the Vichy government.
 1941
In 1941 Legentilhomme was promoted to Major General in the Free French Army and returned to East Africa as the Commander-in-Chief of the Free French Forces in the Sudan and Eritrea.  As part of Brigadier Harold Rawdon Briggs' Briggsforce, Free French forces participated in the East African campaign.  Legentilhomme worked under the supreme command of Field Marshal Archibald Wavell, 1st Earl Wavell.
Created the First French light division or 1st Free French Division (in French "1ère Division légère française libre" or "1ère DLFL").
Commanded the 1st Free French Division and Gentforce during Syria–Lebanon campaign.
Commander in Chief of Free French forces in Africa.
November : Legentilhomme condemned in his absence for treason by the Government of Vichy to the death penalty.
National Commissioner of War
 1942
Awarded the Compagnon de la Libération cross by General Charles de Gaulle on  9 September 1942,
High Commissioner of the French possessions in the Indian Ocean
Governor-General of Madagascar
general Officer Commander in Chief Madagascar
 1943
Member of the Empire Defense Council,
Nominated  Lieutenant General
Nominated Commissaire to the  French Committee for National Liberation
 1944 to 1945
General Officer Commanding 3rd Military Region (France)
from 1945 to 1946 he was General Officer Commanding Paris Military Region.
 1945 to 1947 : Military Governor of Paris
 1946 to 1947 : General Officer Commanding 1st Military Region
 1947 : Promoted Army General
 1947 : Retired
 1950 : Military advisor of the Minister for French overseas departments and territories
 1952 : Technical advisor of the Minister François Mitterrand (who much later was President of the French Republic between 1981 and 1995)
 1952 to 1958 : Member of the Assemblée de l'Union française for the UDSR political party 
 23 May 1975 : Paul Legentilhomme died at age 91 in Villefranche-sur-Mer, France.  He is buried there.

Honour
 Grand Cross of the Légion of Honor
 Compagnon de la Libération
 Médaille militaire
 Croix de guerre 1914–1918
 Croix de guerre 1939–1945
 Knight of the Order of the Dragon of Annam
 Commander of the Order of the Bath (GB)
 Commander of the Legion of Merit (USA)

See also
 Battle of Madagascar

External links
  Full Biography in the ordre de la Libération website
 Biography of Paul Legentilhomme

1884 births
1975 deaths
French generals
French military leaders
French military personnel of World War I
French military personnel of World War II
Colonial Governors of French Madagascar
Commanders of the Legion of Merit
Companions of the Liberation
École Spéciale Militaire de Saint-Cyr alumni
French colonial governors and administrators
French prisoners of war in World War I
Grand Croix of the Légion d'honneur
Honorary Knights Commander of the Order of the Bath
Military governors of Paris
People from Manche
Recipients of the Croix de Guerre 1914–1918 (France)
Recipients of the Croix de Guerre 1939–1945 (France)
Recipients of the Order of the Dragon of Annam
World War I prisoners of war held by Germany